Neoleptonidae is a family of marine bivalve clams of the order Venerida.

Genera in the family Neoleptonidae
 Arculus Monterosato, 1909
 Bernardina Dall, 1910
 Epilepton Dall, 1899
 Halodakra Olsson, 1961
 Neolepton Finley, 1926
 Pachykellya Bernard, 1897
 Puyseguria Powell, 1927

References
 
 Powell A. W. B., New Zealand Mollusca, William Collins Publishers Ltd, Auckland, New Zealand 1979 

 
Bivalve families